Cedric A. Scott (born October 19, 1977) is an American football strength and conditioning coach and former defensive end who is the head strength and conditioning coach for Jacksonville Jaguars of the National Football League (NFL). Scott played college football at the University of Southern Mississippi and was drafted by the New York Giants in the fourth round of the 2001 NFL Draft. He also played for the Cleveland Browns, as well as in NFL Europa for the Scottish Claymores and Edmonton Eskimos of the Canadian Football League (CFL).

Early life 
Cedric Scott was born in Gulfport, Mississippi, before playing college football for the Southern Miss Golden Eagles. He was drafted by the New York Giants in the fourth round of the 2001 NFL Draft and also played for the Cleveland Browns before playing with the Scottish Claymores and Edmonton Eskimos of the Canadian Football League (CFL). He was inducted into the University of Southern Mississippi Hall of Fame in 2015.

Coaching career
Scott joined the Jacksonville Jaguars as an assistant strength coach in 2012. He was promoted to director of strength and conditioning in 2022.

References

1977 births
Living people
American football defensive ends
American players of Canadian football
Canadian football defensive linemen
Cleveland Browns players
Edmonton Elks players
Jacksonville Jaguars coaches
New York Giants players
Sportspeople from Gulfport, Mississippi
Scottish Claymores players
Southern Miss Golden Eagles football players
Southern Miss Golden Eagles football coaches